Westmere may refer to

 a part of Chestermere, Alberta
 Westmere, New York
 Westmere, New Zealand, an Auckland suburb
 Westmere, Victoria
 Westmere, a microarchitecture by Intel that was formerly known as Nehalem-C and is a 32 nm die shrink of the Nehalem microarchitecture